Collimonas pratensis is a bacterium of the genus Collimonas in the Oxalobacteraceae family which was isolated with Collimonas arenae from seminatural grassland soils in the Netherlands. C. pratensis grows in meadow soils.

References

External links
Type strain of Collimonas pratensis at BacDive -  the Bacterial Diversity Metadatabase

Burkholderiales
Bacteria described in 2008